Newport State Airport  (officially known as the Colonel Robert F. Wood Air Park) is a state-owned public-use airport in Newport County, Rhode Island, United States. This airport is included in the National Plan of Integrated Airport Systems for 2011–2015, which categorized it as a general aviation facility. There is no scheduled airline service available, but it once was served by Air New England.

Although many U.S. airports use the same three-letter location identifier for the FAA and IATA, this airport is assigned UUU by the FAA and NPT by the IATA (which assigned UUU to Manumu, Papua New Guinea).

Newport State Airport is one of six active airports operated by the Rhode Island Airport Corporation, the other five being T.F. Green State Airport, North Central State Airport, Westerly State Airport, Quonset State Airport, and Block Island State Airport.

History 
The airport site was known as Southwick's Grove in the mid-to-late 1800s. At the turn of the twentieth century the site was home to Aquidneck Park, a horse racing track. Wealthy summer residents such as Willie K Vanderbilt, John Jacob Astor and I. Townsend Burden would occasionally race automobiles of various types there. The property was renamed Bethshan-in-the-Woods by Mrs. Theodore K. Gibbs, who had purchased it to preserve the property as a picnic ground for children.

Army Air Force Captain Robert F. Wood established the Newport Air Park on the site in 1946. It appears on topographical maps of the area by 1958 with two airstrips—one along the current 4/22 orientation, and a nearly perpendicular one. They were paved by 1953, when the airport received an Air Force contract to maintain planes for keeping local Air Force pilots current.

The airport site was acquired by the state in July 1960, and new construction of the runways and taxiways was completed by September 1967. In July 1964, the first aircraft accident at the Newport airport (a gear-up landing) was documented by the National Transportation Safety Board. The first fatal accident at Newport State Airport was a mid-air collision between two general aviation aircraft on April 23, 1969. In 2011 part of the film Moonrise Kingdom was filmed at the airport.

Facilities and aircraft 

It has two runways with asphalt surfaces:

For the 12-month period ending June 30, 2011, the airport had 20,238 aircraft operations, an average of 55 per day: 98% general aviation, 2% air taxi, and <1% military.
At that time there were 34 aircraft based at this airport: 85% single-engine, 9% multi-engine, and 6% helicopter.

Airlines and destinations

References

External links 
 Newport State Airport (UUU) page from Rhode Island Airport Corp.
 
 Aerial image as of March 1995 from USGS The National Map
 

Airports in Rhode Island
Transportation buildings and structures in Newport County, Rhode Island
Buildings and structures in Middletown, Rhode Island